Bloom Creek is a stream in Ste. Genevieve County in the U.S. state of Missouri. It is a tributary of Madden Creek.

Bloom Creek derives its name from the local Blume family.

See also
List of rivers of Missouri

References

Rivers of Ste. Genevieve County, Missouri
Rivers of Missouri